This is a list of flag bearers who have represented United Arab Emirates at the Olympics.

Flag bearers carry the national flag of their country at the opening ceremony of the Olympic Games.

See also
United Arab Emirates at the Olympics

References

United Arab Emirates at the Olympics
United Arab Emirates
Olympic flagbearers